Cambria Township may refer to the following places in the United States:

 Cambria Township, Saline County, Kansas
 Cambria Township, Michigan
 Cambria Township, Minnesota
 Cambria Township, Pennsylvania
 Cambria Township, South Dakota, town including former village of Plana, South Dakota